Environment Conservation Group (ECG) is a non-governmental organisation based in Coimbatore, India. The group is active since 2009 and works towards conservation of the environment and wildlife. ECG was formed by a group of wildlife and environmental enthusiasts headed by environmental activist Mr.Mohammed Saleem, Mr. Stephen Joseph is the Co-founder and Vice-President.

The group is involved in monitoring the wetlands of Coimbatore against dumping of debris and encroachments. ECG is also involved in advocating sustainability, wildlife conservation and rescuing birds from the wildlife trade. ECG is involved in stopping the felling of trees and conducting awareness programmes.

Click Your Pic 2011
Click Your Pic is a national level photography exhibition organised by ECG to spread awareness about the rich natural heritage of India.The event was organised jointy with Sálim Ali Centre for Ornithology and Natural History and Central Academy for State Forest Service from 3rd - 9 th January 2011 at CASFOS campus. Some of the eminent speakers during the event were Dr. Azeez- Director of SACON, Mr. Marudachalam of Photo centre, Mr. TNA Perumal and Mr. K.Jayaram.

Click Your Pic 2012
This second annual exhibition was held on December 27–30, 2012 at Hindusthan College of Arts and science, Coimbatore. It has received very good response from wildlife photographers across the country. Photography sessions were conducted by Mr. Perumal and Mr. Balan Madhavan. Mr. Bittu Sahgal was one of the chief guests. The Judge of the event was T.N.A. Perumal and Balan Madhavan. The event was sponsored by Savithri Photo House and GLO colour lab.

Click Your Pic 2014
Click your Pic 2014 was held at Brookefields Mall from November 14–19, 2014. The mega photo exhibition drew lot of visitors from across the region, also on display were photographs by India's eminent wildlife photographers including TNA Perumal, Rathika Ramasamy, Kalyan Varma, Balan Madhavan and Sudhir Shivaram . The Judge of the event was Mr. T.N.A. Perumal. The event was sponsored by Panasonic

PATH / SEEK2016
A group of five wildlife conservationist from ECG led by its president R. Mohammed Saleem traveled about 20,000 Kilometers across 22states of India to study roadkill and spread awareness on the impact of roads on wildlife, in February 2016. The team traveled through major wildlife sanctuaries and visited major institutions like IIT Guwahati, University of Jammu, American College, Madurai and University of Calicut to spread awareness among students. The expedition was sponsored by  Hewlett Packard , Sanctuary Asia

SEEK2017
A second international expedition named Save Endangered, Endemic and Key Species (SEEK) was headed by R. Mohammed Saleem, President and Managing Trustee of the organisation. The team members Sisir, Srini, Abishek and Anirudha travelled by Mahindra Scorpio, they visited various wildlife sanctuaries across India. They spread awareness in Dhaka, Bangladesh, Tribhuvan University and Golden Gate International CollegeKathmandu Nepal, IIT Guwahati and many other educational Institutions. The four members traveled for 60 days across India and the neighbouring countries of Bangladesh, Bhutan and Nepal. The expedition was sponsored by WWF, Mahindra Scorpio, Wulf Pro, MapmyIndia and CRI Pumps.

SEEK2019
The third expedition SEEK2019 was organised to document the threatened birds of India as well as to spread awareness on the importance of birds. The four member SEEK2019 team consisted of Dr. P.A. Azeez, former director - Salim Ali Centre for Ornithology and Natural History, Ministry of Environment Forest and Climate Change, Government of India, Dr. Ravi Rishi - a physician, Mr. Makathan, headed by Mr. R. Mohammed Saleem. The team travelled across India for 79 days in search of elusive and rare birds. The team were successful in spotting the whinchat for the first time in India.
 During the expedition the team visited various educational institutions and NGOs. The expedition was sponsored by Carl Zeiss, Coimbatore City Round Table 31, NM & Co., Wulf Pro, MapmyIndia, Pricol, Sulochana Mills and Twin Birds

Save Coimbatore Racecourse
ECG spearheaded the Save Coimbatore Race course movement. It grew into a mass movement in a very short time.  ECG along with other associations, stakeholders and general public's support were able to stop the indiscriminate cutting of trees on race course in the name of Smart City development, thanks to their efforts the green spaces were successfully reclaimed at Coimbatore Racecourse. Save Race course movement

Sponsorship & Support
ECG activities are made possible due to generous support from corporates and individuals; some of them are:
 National Geographic
 WWF
 Carl Zeiss
 Google
 HP
 Panasonic
 Mahindra & Mahindra
 Sanctuary Asia
 Fire Bird Institution
 MapmyIndia
 Coimbatore Round Table
 Coleman
 Twin Birds
 N Mahalingam & Co
 Sulochana Mills
 Apollo Tyres
 Pricol
 CRI Pumps

The ECG has received voluntary support from celebrities of film industry, including Nassar (actor)Famous Film Star Nazar speak on Wildlife Conservation, Vijay Sethupathi, Vivek (actor), Ponvannan and SingamuthuTamil Film star Singamuthu Invites you,

References 

Nature conservation organisations based in India
Nature conservation in India
Organisations based in Coimbatore
2009 establishments in Tamil Nadu
Organizations established in 2009
Sustainability advocates